The Arafura Games is a multi-sport event where athletes with a disability and able-bodied athletes compete in the same program. It is held every two years in the Australian city of Darwin, Northern Territory. The Arafura Games takes its name from the Arafura Sea, which lies between northern Australia and Southeast Asia.

Results

References

External links
 Official Webpage

Cricket
Cricket in the Northern Territory
Cricket at multi-sport events
International cricket competitions in Australia